Trevor Allan Richard Horne (born March 24, 1991) is a Canadian politician who was elected in the 2015 Alberta general election to the Legislative Assembly of Alberta representing the electoral district of Spruce Grove-St. Albert. He is a student in political science at MacEwan University in Edmonton.

Prior to his election, Horne was a barista at a St. Albert Starbucks.

Electoral history

2015 general election

References

1991 births
Alberta New Democratic Party MLAs
Living people
People from St. Albert, Alberta
Politicians from Edmonton
21st-century Canadian politicians